The Medical College of Wisconsin (MCW) is a private medical school, pharmacy school, and graduate school of sciences headquartered in Milwaukee, Wisconsin. The school was established in 1893 and is the largest research center in eastern Wisconsin. It is associated with Froedtert Hospital as well as Children's Hospital of Wisconsin and houses the Center for Infectious Disease Research There are two additional campuses, one in Green Bay and one in Wausau.

MCW is accredited by the Higher Learning Commission of the North Central Association of Colleges and Schools (HLC) and by the Liaison Committee on Medical Education (LCME). It is the only private medical school in Wisconsin, and one of only two medical schools in Wisconsin, along with the University of Wisconsin School of Medicine and Public Health in Madison.

History
The Medical College began to be realized with the founding of the Wisconsin College of Physicians and Surgeons in 1893 and of Milwaukee Medical College in 1894. In 1906, Marquette College (now Marquette University), merged with the nearby Milwaukee Medical College. On May 14, 1907, Milwaukee Medical College became the Medical Department of the newly chartered Marquette University.
  
In 1913, in response to the standards introduced by the Flexner Report, Marquette University purchased the Wisconsin College of Physicians and Surgeons, thereby creating a separate institution, the Marquette University School of Medicine.

During World War II, the school developed close ties with the local Veterans Health Administration hospital in Milwaukee.

In the 1950s, local philanthropist Kurtis Froedtert, bequeathed much of his estate to the establishment of a teaching hospital, which became today's Froedtert Memorial Lutheran Hospital. Opened  in 1980, Froedtert Hospital is adjacent to MCW and is one of the three major affiliated health care centers where MCW students, residents and physicians practice.

On September 30, 1967, Marquette University terminated its relationship with the medical school because of financial difficulties, and the school continued as a private school. It changed its name to the Medical College of Wisconsin in 1970.

MCW has more than 16,000 alumni, all of whom are represented by the Medical College of Wisconsin-Marquette Medical Alumni Association.

Academics
There are more than 1,200 students enrolled in education programs at the Medical College of Wisconsin. This consists of about 817 medical students and 400 graduate students. An additional 670 physicians in residency and 180 physicians in fellowship training work with the College's affiliated hospitals throughout the state. About 160 scientists conduct postdoctoral research with MCW.

MCW opened a new campus in Green Bay in July 2015 that provides a focused, three-year curriculum for students seeking careers in primary care, general surgery, or psychiatry. The college subsequently opened the Central Wisconsin campus, located in Wausau, in July 2016.

MCW grants M.D., Pharm.D., Ph.D, M.S., M.P.H., M.A., and combination degrees. Through the Medical Scientist Training Program (MSTP), students may enter a combined M.D./Ph.D. degree program.

Joint degree programs with other institutions are offered in: bioinformatics (MS) and healthcare technologies management (MS) with Marquette University, and medical informatics (MS) with the Milwaukee School of Engineering. In addition, Graduate Certificate programs are offered in Clinical Bioethics, Public Health, Research Ethics, and a joint Bioethics Certificate with the American Medical Association. Residency training is offered in nearly 30 medical specialties and subspecialties.

Admissions
The Medical College of Wisconsin uses a holistic approach to admissions. Student selection is based on a careful analysis of their suitability for the medical profession. Academic achievement, MCAT scores, and Casper score are evaluated. Subjective factors include applicant's personal statement, essays, experiences, recommendations, and interviews. The average MCAT score and undergraduate GPA for the entering class of 2021 were 511 and 3.75, respectively. About 58% of the incoming class was female.

Research
MCW the largest research center in the Milwaukee metropolitan area and the second-largest in Wisconsin. $300 million was invested in research, teaching, training and related purposes in fiscal year FY20 (7/1/19 - 6/30/2020). In this timeframe, the institution ranks in the top third of all US medical schools in NIH research support.

Notable alumni
Larry Bucshon – U.S. Representative from Indiana
Sarah K. England – physiologist and biophysicist
Olawale Sulaiman – neurosurgeon and academic
Richard D. Weisel – cardiothoracic surgeon, professor of surgery at University of Toronto, editor-in-chief of the Journal of Thoracic and Cardiovascular Surgery
Don J. Wright - Acting United States Secretary of Health and Human Services and United States Ambassador to Tanzania
Jeffery D. Molkentin - molecular biologist and co-director of Cincinnati Children's Hospital Heart Institute

References

External links

 
Educational institutions established in 1893
Former Catholic universities and colleges in the United States
Marquette University
Medical schools in Wisconsin
Schools of public health in the United States
1893 establishments in Wisconsin
Private universities and colleges in Wisconsin